Hawk Ravine is a former settlement in Butte County, California. It lay at an elevation of 1266 feet (386 m). It still appeared on maps as of 1897.

References

External links

Former settlements in Butte County, California
Former populated places in California